The Gentle Indifference of the World is a 2018 Kazakhstani drama film directed by Adilkhan Yerzhanov. It was screened in the Un Certain Regard section at the 2018 Cannes Film Festival.

Cast
 Adiya Mussina

References

External links
 

2018 films
2018 drama films
Kazakh-language films
Kazakhstani drama films